Barretter may refer to:
 Hot wire barretter, an early form of radio demodulator
 Iron-hydrogen resistor or barretter, a hydrogen-filled glass bulb in which an iron wire is located

See also
 Baretta (disambiguation)
 Bereta (disambiguation)
 Beretta
 Biretta